This is a complete list of players for the Edmonton Oilers of the World Hockey Association (WHA).
It includes players that have played at least one regular season or playoff game for the Edmonton Oilers (or the Alberta Oilers, as they were known in their inaugural season) as a franchise in the World Hockey Association between 1972 and 1979.

A total of 130 skaters and 14 goalies played for the Oilers in the seven seasons between 1972–73 and 1978–79.  Of those, 16 also played for the Oilers after they joined the National Hockey League for the 1979–80 NHL season.

Only one player, defenceman Al Hamilton, played with the Oilers for their entire seven seasons in the WHA; Hamilton leads all WHA Oilers with 455 games played in the regular season, and holds the team record for 27 playoff games played (he also scored the most regular season points, with 311). The goaltender with the longest career as a WHA Oiler is Dave Dryden, having played four seasons with the club; Dryden leads all goaltenders with 197 regular season games played, and holds the team record for 18 playoff games played (he also registered the most regular season wins, with 94). There are five skaters and one goaltender who only played a single game as an Oiler during these years, and one player who never played a regular season game (participated in two playoff games).

Four ex-Oilers from the WHA era were later elected into the Hockey Hall of Fame: Jacques Plante (1978), Norm Ullman (1982), and Wayne Gretzky (1999) as players, and Glen Sather (1997) in the builder category.

Key

Goaltenders

Skaters

References

 
Edmonton Oilers
WHA players